Provincial Resource Program for Autism and Related Disorders is a specialized program within School District 37 Delta. The program is funded by the Ministry of Education to serve the needs of school age students with profound developmental disorders or disabilities that limit their ability to participate in a regular school environment.

High schools in Delta, British Columbia